The 2014 Copa Libertadores de América Finals was a two-legged final that decided the winner of the 2014 Copa Libertadores de América, the 55th edition of the Copa Libertadores de América, South America's premier international club football tournament organized by CONMEBOL.

The finals was contested in two-legged home-and-away format between Paraguayan team Nacional and Argentine team San Lorenzo. The first leg was hosted by Nacional at Estadio Defensores del Chaco in Asunción on 6 August, while the second leg was hosted by San Lorenzo at Estadio Pedro Bidegain in Buenos Aires on 13 August 2014. The winner earned the right to represent CONMEBOL at the 2014 FIFA Club World Cup, entering at the semifinal stage, and the right to play against the 2014 Copa Sudamericana winners in the 2015 Recopa Sudamericana.

The first leg ended in a 1–1 draw. The second led ended with a 1–0 win for San Lorenzo, and they won the tournament for the first time in their history.

Qualified teams

Both teams came into the finals as first-time finalists of the Copa Libertadores. San Lorenzo had previously won two CONMEBOL titles: the 2001 Copa Mercosur and the 2002 Copa Sudamericana.

Venues

Road to the finals

Note: In all scores below, the score of the home team is given first.

Format
The finals were played on a home-and-away two-legged basis, with the higher-seeded team hosting the second leg. If tied on aggregate, 30 minutes of extra time was played. If still tied after extra time, the penalty shoot-out was used to determine the winner.

Match details

First leg
San Lorenzo took the lead in the first leg when Mauro Matos volleyed the ball right footed into the left of the net after a cross from the right. Julio Santa Cruz got the equalizer in the 93rd minute of the match when he turned the ball home high to the net from six yards out with his right foot after a cross from the left was headed onto him.

Second leg
Néstor Ortigoza scored the only goal of the game, a penalty after a shot from Martín Cauteruccio struck the right hand of Ramón Coronel. Ortigoza hit the ball right footed to the left of the goalkeeper who dived the other way.

See also
2015 Recopa Sudamericana

References

External links
 
Copa Libertadores 2014, CONMEBOL.com 

Finals
2014
L
L
2014 in Argentine football
2014 in Paraguayan football
Football in Buenos Aires
Sports competitions in Asunción
August 2014 sports events in South America
Sports competitions in Buenos Aires
2014 Copa Libertadores Finals
2014 Copa Libertadores Finals